This is a list of curling clubs in the Canadian province of Saskatchewan. They are organized by the provincial curling association, CURLSASK, into eight regions. Curling is the provincial sport of Saskatchewan.

Regina Region
Caledonian Curling Club - Regina
Highland Curling Club - Regina

Saskatoon Region
C.N. Curling Club - Saskatoon
Nutana Curling Club - Saskatoon
Sutherland Curling Club - Saskatoon

North West Region
Big River Curling Club - Big River
Blaine Lake Curling Club - Blaine Lake
Dalmeny Curling Club - Dalmeny
Debden Curling Club - Debden
Denzil Curling Club - Denzil
Edam Curling Club - Edam
Langham Curling Club - Langham
Lashburn Curling Club - Lashburn
Livelong Curling Club - Livelong
Maidstone Curling Club - Maidstone
Makwa Curling Club - Makwa
Meadow Lake Curling Club - Meadow Lake
Medstead Curling Club - Medstead
Shell Lake Curling Club - Shell Lake
Spiritwood Curling Club - Spiritwood
Turtleford Curling Club - Turtleford
Twin Rivers Curling Club - North Battleford
Unity Curling Club - Unity
Wilkie Curling Club - Wilkie

North East Region
Arborfield Curling Club - Arborfield
Birch Hills Curling Club - Birch Hillsx`
Canwood Curling Club - Canwood
Carrot River Curling Club - Carrot River
Hudson Bay Curling Club - Hudson Bay
Lakeland Curling Club - Christopher Lake 
Melfort Curling Club - Melfort
Naicam Curling Club - Naicam
Nipawin Curling Club - Nipawin
Prince Albert Golf & Curling Club - Prince Albert
Shellbrook Curling Club - Shellbrook
St. Front Curling Club - Rose Valley
Tisdale Curling Club - Tisdale
Wakaw Curling Club - Wakaw
Weekes Curling Club - Weekes

West Central Region
Aberdeen Curling Club - Aberdeen
Allan Curling Club - Allan
Biggar Curling Club - Biggar
Davidson Curling Club - Davidson
Hanley Curling Club - Hanley
Kerrobert Curling Club - Kerrobert
Kindersley Curling Club - Kindersley
Kyle Curling Club - Kyle
Martensville Curling Club - Martensville
Outlook Curling Club - Outlook
Rosetown Curling Club - Rosetown
Watrous Curling Club - Watrous

East Central Region
Churchbridge Curling Club - Churchbridge
Esterhazy Curling Club - Esterhazy
Foam Lake Curling Club - Foam Lake
Humboldt Curling Club - Humboldt
Indian Head Curling Club - Indian Head
Ituna Curling Club - Ituna
Kamsack Curling Club - Kamsack
Langenburg Curling Club - Langenburg
Lanigan Curling Club - Lanigan
Leroy Curling Club - Leroy
Lumsden Curling Club - Lumsden
Melville Curling Club - Melville
Muenster Curling Club - Muenster
Nokomis Curling Club - Nokomis
Norquay Curling Club - Norquay
Preeceville Curling Club - Preeceville
Raymore Curling Club - Raymore
Saltcoats Curling Club - Saltcoats
Strasbourg Curling Club - Strasbourg
Wadena Curling Club - Wadena
Yorkton Curling Club - Yorkton

South East Region
Alameda Curling Club - Alameda
Arcola Curling Club - Arcola
Avonlea Curling Club - Avonlea
Balgonie Curling Club - Balgonie
Bengough Curling Club - Bengough
Bienfait Curling Club - Bienfait
Carlyle Curling Club - Carlyle
Carnduff Curling Club - Carnduff
Estevan Curling Club - Estevan
Gainsborough Curling Club - Gainsborough
Grenfell Curling Club - Grenfell
Kipling Curling Club - Kipling
Kronau Curling Club - Kronau
Lemberg Curling Club - Lemberg
Maryfield Curling Club - Maryfield
Midale Curling Club - Midale
Moosomin Curling Club - Moosomin
Neudorf Curling Club - Neudorf
Ogema Curling Club - Ogema
Oxbow Curling Club - Oxbow
Pense Curling Club - Pense
Redvers Curling Club - Redvers
Stoughton Curling Club - Stoughton
Wawota Curling Club - Wawota
Weyburn Curling Club - Weyburn

South West Region
Abbey Curling Club - Abbey
Assiniboia Curling Club - Assiniboia
Burstall Curling Club - Burstall
Central Butte Curling Club - Central Butte
Coronach Curling Club - Coronach
Eastend Curling Club - Eastend
Fox Valley Curling Club - Fox Valley
Frontier Curling Club - Frontier
Glentworth Curling Club - Glentworth
Gravelbourg Curling Club - Gravelbourg
Gull Lake Curling Club - Gull Lake
Hazlet Curling Club - Hazlet
Herbert Curling Club - Herbert
Lafleche Curling Club - Lafleche
Leader Curling Club - Leader
Maple Creek Curling Club - Maple Creek
Moose Jaw Curling Centre - Moose Jaw
Morse Curling Club - Morse
Mossbank Curling Club - Mossbank
Shaunavon Curling Club - Shaunavon
Swift Current Curling Club - Swift Current

Not in any region
Lloydminster Curling Club - Lloydminster (a member of Curling Alberta)

 Saskatchewan
Curling clubs
 
Curling in Saskatchewan
Saskatchewan